The 2019 FIA World Cup for Cross-Country Bajas was the first season of the reformed FIA World Cup for Cross-Country Bajas; an annual competition for baja-style rally raid events for cars, buggies, side-by-sides, and trucks held in multiple countries. The championship was last held in 2010, after which the baja events were combined with the longer cross-country rallies to form the FIA World Cup for Cross-Country Rallies.

Calendar
The 2019 edition of the world cup featured eight cross-country baja events. The longer cross-country rally events remained part of the regular Cross-Country Rally World Cup. Some events on the schedule were shared with the 2019 FIM Bajas World Cup.

The FIA awarded the world cup to drivers, co-drivers, and teams competing in the T1 category; whilst drivers and teams in the T2 and T3 categories were awarded FIA cups.

Notable teams and drivers

Results

Overall

T2 category

T3 category

Championship standings
In order to score points in the Cup classifications, competitors must register with the FIA before the entry closing date of the first baja entered.
Points system
 Points for final positions are awarded as per the following table:

FIA World Cup for Drivers, Co-Drivers, and Teams

Drivers' & Co-Drivers' championships

Teams' championship

FIA T2 Cup for Drivers and Teams

FIA T3 Cup for Drivers and Teams

References

External links 
 

Cross Country Rally World Cup
World Cup for Cross-Country Bajas
World Cup for Cross-Country Bajas